Adam Edward Chubb (born July 5, 1981) is a former American basketball player.

Chubb was born in Harrisburg, Pennsylvania. He attended the Wharton School at the University of Pennsylvania where he was a dual athlete: Basketball and Track and Field high jump.  Chubb held the University of Pennsylvania High Jump record at 7-2.5 (2.2m) from 2001 until it was broken by Maalik Reynolds (7-5.75) in 2011.

After college he went on to have a successful 12 season professional basketball career in Asia and Europe.  During his career, Chubb won the German Basketball Cup three times (2008, 2009, 2015), and was a Eurocup runner-up in 2010 with Alba Berlin. 
Chubb was MVP of the German Basketball Cup (2008) with the Artland Dragons.
Also, Adam Chubb was a 3-time German League All-Star Team member (2008, 2012, 2014).

In German Bundesliga History:
14th in all-time Points
7th in all-time Rebounds
6th in all-time Blocked Shots

Adam Chubb now resides in Charleston, South Carolina with his family. He is owner and managing partner of www.pinnaclelifellc.com where he helps families and small businesses plan for the future through life insurance, disability insurance and long-term care insurance.

References

External links
 Liga ACB profile
 Bundesliga profile
 Euroleague profile

1981 births
Living people
Alba Berlin players
American expatriate basketball people in Germany
American expatriate basketball people in South Korea
American expatriate basketball people in Spain
Artland Dragons players
Basket Zaragoza players
Basketball players from Harrisburg, Pennsylvania
Centers (basketball)
Crailsheim Merlins players
Eisbären Bremerhaven players
EWE Baskets Oldenburg players
Giessen 46ers players
Liga ACB players
Penn Quakers men's basketball players
Power forwards (basketball)
Ulsan Hyundai Mobis Phoebus players
American men's basketball players
United States men's national basketball team players